Joseph "Jazzbow" Henry Buskey (December 18, 1902 – April 11, 1949) was an American professional baseball player who played in five games for the Philadelphia Phillies in . He scored one run on no hits and one walk.

He was born in Cumberland, Maryland and died there at the age of 46.

External links

1902 births
1949 deaths
Baseball players from Maryland
Sportspeople from Cumberland, Maryland
Major League Baseball shortstops
Augusta Tygers players
Bradenton Growers players
Cumberland Colts players
Oneonta Indians players
Philadelphia Phillies players
Spartanburg Spartans players
Springfield Senators players
Tampa Smokers players
Utica Utes players